Trinchesia taita is a species of sea slug, an aeolid nudibranch, a marine gastropod mollusc in the family Trinchesiidae.

Distribution
This species was described from shallow water at Oyster Bay, Dar es Salaam, Tanzania.

References 

Trinchesiidae
Gastropods described in 1970